Manhente is a Portuguese parish, located in the municipality of Barcelos. The population in 2011 was 1,703, in an area of 3.91 km².

References

Freguesias of Barcelos, Portugal